The BBC Sessions by Texas was released on 24 September 2007. It contains 24 tracks recorded at the BBC studios in London.

Between 12 March 1989 and 18 October 2003, Texas recorded ten sessions for the BBC Radio network, selected highlights of which are featured on this collection.

A Universal double CD exists from an earlier stage in the compilation process. It containing all the tracks on the final album and some additional tracks that were omitted from the final selection. On one known copy of the CDs, some but not all of these additional tracks are crossed out. The additional tracks were from taken from the same 10 sessions.

Track listing

Disc 1

Disc 2

Track listing for Universal work in progress CD

Disc 1

Disc 2

On the CD sleeve for CD1, the following tracks were crossed out, track 5, "Every Day Now" and track 7, "A Prayer For You". There were also some spelling errors, "Future Is Promises" being titled "Future Is Promised" and "The Thrill Has Gone" being titled "The Truth Is Gone" on track 6 but correctly titled for track 1.

On the CD sleeve for CD2, the following tracks were crossed out, track 5, "You Owe It All To Me"; track 6, "Black Eyed Boy"; track 10, "Say What You Want" and track 13, "Black Eyed Boy". On CD2, in-between track 10, "Blacked Eyed Boy" and track 11, "Halo", was listed "River". This however was not on the CD. The Simon Mayo Session was listed twice in error but only appears on the CD once.

Texas (band) albums
BBC Radio recordings
2007 albums
2007 compilation albums
Universal Records compilation albums
Universal Records live albums